Restaurant Suri–Carl Ras is a Danish UCI Continental team founded in 2019.

Team roster

Major wins
2021
Himmerland Rundt, Mathias Larsen

References

UCI Continental Teams (Europe)
Cycling teams based in Denmark
Cycling teams established in 2019
2019 establishments in Denmark